The eighth and final season of the American spy thriller television drama series Homeland premiered on February 9, 2020, and concluded on April 26, 2020, on Showtime, consisting of 12 episodes.

Plot 
Saul Berenson, the National Security Advisor for newly inaugurated President Ralph Warner, is assigned to negotiate peace with the Taliban in Afghanistan. Carrie Mathison is still struggling to recover from her brutal treatment as a prisoner in Russia, but Saul wants to take her to Afghanistan, feeling her knowledge and experience there are essential.

Cast and characters

Main

 Claire Danes as Carrie Mathison, a former CIA case officer and station chief
 Maury Sterling as Max Piotrowski, a surveillance expert and Carrie's trusted associate
 Costa Ronin as Yevgeny Gromov, a Russian GRU officer
 Nimrat Kaur as Tasneem Qureishi, the head of the Pakistani Inter-Services Intelligence agency
 Numan Acar as Haissam Haqqani, the head of the Taliban
 Linus Roache as David Wellington, the White House Chief of Staff
 Mandy Patinkin as Saul Berenson, Carrie's former boss and mentor, and the National Security Advisor

Recurring 
 Mohammad Bakri as Abdul Qadir G'ulom, the Vice President and, later, President of Afghanistan
 Tim Guinee as Scott Ryan, chief of special operations at the CIA
 Andrea Deck as Jenna Bragg, a CIA field agent in Kabul
 Cliff Chamberlain as Mike Dunne, the CIA station chief in Kabul
 Charles Brice as Staff Sergeant John Durkin, a U.S. Army soldier serving in Afghanistan
 Sam Chance as Specialist Drew Soto, serving in Afghanistan
 Octavio Rodriguez as Specialist Arturo Gonzales, a U.S. Army soldier serving in Afghanistan
 Victor Almanzar as Staff Sergeant Justin Wenzel, a U.S. Army soldier serving in Afghanistan
 Jason Tottenham as Alan Yager, a CIA field agent in Kabul
 Emilio Cuesta as Specialist Charlie Stoudt, a U.S. Army soldier serving in Afghanistan
 Art Malik as Bunran Latif, a retired Pakistani general
 Sam Trammell as Benjamin Hayes, the vice president and later President of the United States
 Elham Ehsas as Jalal Haqqani, Haissam's rebellious son
 Seear Kohi as Balach, a Taliban loyal to Haissam
 Eugene Lee as General Mears
 Terry Serpico as General Owens, a U.S. Army general serving in Afghanistan
 Tracy Shayne as Janet Gaeto, U.S. Ambassador to Afghanistan
 Mustafa Haidari as Firooz
 Karen Pittman as Vanessa Kroll, an FBI agent
 Hugh Dancy as John Zabel, a foreign policy advisor to the President of the United States

Guest 

 Mohammad Amiri as Arman, a friend of Carrie's in Kabul
 Kevork Malikyan as Agha Jan
 Anna Kathryn Holbrook as Robin
 David Hunt as Jim Turrow
 Jonjo O'Neill as Doug
 Anna Francolini as Dr. Foley
 Sitara Attaie as Samira Noori
 Beau Bridges as Ralph Warner, the President of the United States
 Christopher Maleki as President Daoud, the President of Afghanistan
 Michael Rabe as Chief Mechanic Worley
 Sharif Dorani as Barlas
 Austin Basis as Lonnie
 Kate Burton as Doris Warner, Ralph Warner's wife
 Zineb Triki as Judge Haziq Qadir
 Adnan Jaffar as General Aziz
 Elya Baskin as Viktor Makarov, Russian Ambassador to the United States
 Samrat Chakrabarti as Ambassador Rashad, Pakistan Ambassador to the United States
 Chris Bauer as Kevin Dance
 Ben Savage as young Saul Berenson
 Robin McLeavy as Charlotte Benson
 Merab Ninidze as Mirov
 Tatyana Mukha as Anna Pomerantseva
 Julie Engelbrecht as young Anna Pomerantseva
 Robert Clotworthy as Judge
 Amy Hargreaves as Maggie Mathison, Carrie's sister
 Jacqueline Antaramian as Dorit, Saul's sister
 Jon Lindstrom as Claude Geroux

Kamasi Washington makes a special appearance in the series finale.

Episodes

Production 
The eighth season was ordered back-to-back with season 7 in August 2016. In April 2018, Claire Danes confirmed that season 8 would be the last, and Showtime officially confirmed the final season in August. In April 2018, showrunner Alex Gansa stated his plans for the final season, "Season 8 will be overseas somewhere. We get to play a story with larger national stakes in season 7 and we'll go back to a smaller intelligence-based season in 8." He also stated, "We're going to start fresh in season 8 and probably do a fairly big time jump between 7 and 8 and put any Trump parallels behind us" and "We'll tell a very contained story, hopefully in Israel." In January 2019, it was confirmed that the final season will take place in Afghanistan, with filming beginning in February in Morocco.

The season was originally planned to debut in June 2019, however, it was delayed until late 2019 "because of production demands of our international locations", per Showtime co-president Gary Levine. In August 2019, Showtime delayed the premiere again to February 2020; Levine stated, "Homeland is an ambitious series — especially in its final season. [Showrunner] Alex [Gansa] wants to go out proudly, and that has involved production in multiple countries at times and in places that have some issues. It just takes time." He added, "There have been no missteps. It's been a relatively smooth process. But it's a very ambitious production schedule and it has taken more time than we [anticipated]."

During an April 2020 interview on Homeland Season 8, Jalal Haqqani actor Elham Ehsas commented, "I think Haissam (Haqqani) was both Jalal’s biggest idol and biggest heartbreak."

Reception 
The eighth season received highly positive reviews. On Rotten Tomatoes, the season has an approval rating of 85% based on 25 reviews, with an average rating of 7.27/10. The site's critical consensus is, "Homeland returns to form with a tautly thrilling final season that fittingly finishes the job Carrie Mathison started all those years ago." On Metacritic, the season has a score of 71 out of 100 based on 10 critics, indicating "generally favorable reviews".

Robert Rorke of the New York Post wrote, "The first three episodes are a bit clunky, with Carrie's familiar pattern of alienating nearly everyone she meets kicking in again – and then Episode 4 comes along and Homeland finds its groove." Ben Travers of IndieWire gave it a "B+" grade and praised the performances of Claire Danes and Mandy Patinkin, as well as the direction by Lesli Linka Glatter "for her beautifully staged and tensely cut action sequences".

Ratings

Accolades
At the 72nd Primetime Emmy Awards, Lesli Linka Glatter received a nomination for Outstanding Directing for a Drama Series for the series finale "Prisoners of War". At the 11th Critics' Choice Television Awards, Claire Danes received a nomination for Best Actress in a Drama Series.

References

External links 
 
 

2020 American television seasons
8
Television episodes set in Afghanistan